Seán an tSalainn French (1489–1546) was Mayor of Galway from 1538 to 1539.

French was born in Galway, a member of one of The Tribes of Galway. Baptised John, he was known as Seán an tSalainn ('John of the Salt') because of the immense wealth he accrued as a merchant. He financed several additions to St. Nicholas' Collegiate Church, and had a chapel built on the south side of St. Francis Abbey. A large stone building, called John French's Chamber, was erected on arches, just outside the town walls, over the river Corrib.

Four of his sons later became Mayors - Dominick (1568–69); Peter (1576–77); Robuck French (1582–83); Marcus French (1604–1605).

References
 History of Galway, James Hardiman, Galway, 1820.
 Old Galway, Maureen Donovan O'Sullivan, 1942.
 Henry, William (2002). Role of Honour: The Mayors of Galway City 1485–2001. Galway: Galway City Council.  
 Martyn, Adrian, The Tribes of Galway:1124–1642, Galway, 2016. 

1489 births
1546 deaths
Mayors of Galway
Politicians from County Galway
16th-century Irish businesspeople